Nanorana yunnanensis, commonly known as Yunnan paa frog, Yunnan spiny frog, Bourret's paa frog or Bourret's frog, is a species of frog in the  family Dicroglossidae. It is found in southwestern China, Vietnam, Myanmar, northern Thailand, and likely in the intervening Laos. Its natural habitats are small and large streams in montane forests, scrub vegetation and grasslands, and it has also been found in ditches. It is threatened primarily by collection for human consumption, but also by habitat loss caused by agricultural development and infrastructure development.

References

yunnanensis
Frogs of China
Amphibians of Myanmar
Amphibians of Thailand
Amphibians of Vietnam
Amphibians described in 1879
Taxa named by John Anderson (zoologist)
Taxonomy articles created by Polbot
Endangered Fauna of China